Emomali Rahmon (born Emomali Sharipovich Rahmonov, ; ; born 5 October 1952) is a Tajik politician and statesman who has been serving as 3rd President of Tajikistan since 16 November 1994. Previously he was the Chairman of the Supreme Assembly of Tajikistan, as the de facto head of state from 20 November 1992 to 16 November 1994 (the post of president was temporarily abolished during this period). Since 18 March 1998, he has also served as the leader of the People's Democratic Party of Tajikistan, which dominates the Parliament of Tajikistan. On 30 September 1999, he was elected vice-president of the UN General Assembly for a one-year term.

He became widely known in 1992 after the abolition of the post of president in the country, when at the dawn of the civil war (1992–1997) he became Chairman of the Supreme Soviet (Parliament) of Tajikistan as a compromise candidate between communists and neo-communists on the one hand and liberal-democratic, nationalist and Islamist forces (the United Tajik Opposition) on the other.

Five times (in the elections of 1994, 1999, 2006, 2013 and 2020), Rahmon won undemocratic presidential elections; in addition, he extended and reformed his powers based on the results of the national constitutional referendums of 1999 and 2003. Since 25 December 2015, Emomali Rahmon has held the lifetime title of Peshvoyi Millat, which means “Leader of the Nation”, in full — “Founder of peace and national Unity — Leader of the Nation”. Following the results of the last national constitutional referendum in 2016, amendments were adopted that lifted the restrictions on the number of re-elections to the post of President of Tajikistan and lowered the age limit for those running for the post of president from 35 to 30 years.

Rahmon heads an authoritarian regime in Tajikistan with elements of a cult of personality. Political opponents are repressed, violations of human rights and freedoms are severe, elections are not free and fair, and corruption and nepotism are rampant. His family members occupy various important government positions, such as his 35-year-old son Rustam Emomali, who is the chairman of the country's parliament and the mayor of its capital city, Dushanbe.

Early life
Rahmon was born as Emomali Sharipovich Rakhmonov to Sharif Rahmonov (–1992) and Mayram Sharifova (1910–2004), a peasant family in Danghara, Kulob Oblast (present-day Khatlon Region). His father was a Red Army veteran of World War II, being a recipient of the Order of Glory in the 2nd and 3rd degrees. From 1971-74, Rahmon served in the Soviet Union's Pacific Fleet, during which he was stationed in the Primorsky Krai. After completing the military service, Rahmon returned to his native village where he worked for some time as an electrician.

As a rising apparatchik in Tajikistan, he became a chairman of the collective state farm of his native Danghara. According to his official biography, Rahmon graduated from the Tajik State National University with a specialist's degree in economics in 1982. After working for several years in the Danghara Sovkhoz, Rahmon was appointed chairman of the sovkhoz in 1987.

Early politics

In 1990, Rahmon was elected a people's deputy to the Supreme Soviet of the Tajik SSR. President Rahmon Nabiyev was forced to resign in the first months of the Civil War in August 1992. Akbarsho Iskandrov, Speaker of the Supreme Soviet, became acting president. Iskandarov resigned in November 1992 in an attempt to end the civil unrest. That same month, the Supreme Soviet met in Khujand for its 16th session and declared Tajikistan a parliamentary republic. Rahmon was then elected by the members of the Supreme Soviet as its chairman—as the Parliamentary republican system adopted by Tajikistan did not provide for a ceremonial president, he was also Head of State—and the head of government. Former Interior Minister Yaqub Salimov later recalled that Rahmon's appointment was made because he was “nondescript”, in which other field commanders thought that he could be cast aside "when he had served his purpose."

Presidency 

In 1994, a new constitution reestablished the presidency. Rahmon was elected to the post on 6 November 1994 and sworn in ten days later. During the civil war that lasted from 1992 to 1997, Rahmon's rule was opposed by the United Tajik Opposition. As many as 100,000 people died during the war. He survived an assassination attempt on 30 April 1997 in Khujand, as well as two attempted coups in August 1997 and in November 1998.

Following constitutional changes, he was reelected on 6 November 1999 to a seven-year term, officially taking 97% of the vote. On 22 June 2003, he won a referendum that would allow him to run for two more consecutive seven-year terms after his term expired in 2006. The opposition alleges that this amendment was hidden in a way that verged upon electoral fraud. Rahmon was reelected to a seven-year term in a controversial election on 6 November 2006, with about 79% of the vote, according to the official results. On 6 November 2013, he was reelected for the second seven-year term in office, with about 84% of the vote, in an election that the Organization for Security and Co-operation in Europe said lacked "genuine choice and meaningful pluralism". In October 2020, he was once again re-elected as president for a fifth term with a margin of 90.92%, amid allegations of fraud.

On 22 May 2016, a nationwide referendum approved a number of changes to the country's constitution. One of the main changes lifted the limit on presidential terms, effectively allowing Rahmon to stay in power for as many terms as he wishes. Other key changes outlawed faith-based political parties, thus finalizing the removal of the outlawed Islamic Revival Party from Tajikistan's politics, and reduced the minimum eligibility age for presidential candidates from 35 to 30, enabling Rahmon's older son, Rustam Emomali, to run for president any time after 2017. In January 2017, Rustam Emomali was appointed Mayor of Dushanbe, a key position, which some analysts see as the next step to the top of the government.

Tajikistan under Rahmon is a neopatrimonial regime, characterized by a high degree of clientelism, corruption, and poor governance. In a diplomatic cable that was leaked in 2010, the U.S. ambassador in Tajikistan, reported that Rahmon and his family control the country's major businesses, including the largest bank. In November 2018, Rahmon launched a hydroelectric station to solve energy problems.

Role in War on Terror

In July 2021, over 1,000 Afghan troops and civilians fled to Tajikistan after the Taliban insurgents took control of many parts of Afghanistan. In response, Rahmon ordered 20,000 reserve servicemen of the country's Ground Forces to be sent to the Afghan–Tajik border.

Cult of personality and powers 

In December 2015, a law passed by Tajikistan's parliament gave Rahmon the title "Founder Of Peace and National Unity, Leader of the Nation" (Tajik: Асосгузори сулҳу ваҳдати миллӣ – Пешвои миллат, Asosguzori sulhu vahdati millî – Peshvo‘i millat; Russian: Основатель мира и национального единства – Лидер нации, Osnovatel mira i natsionalnogo yedinstva – Lider natsii). A shorter version of the title, "Leader of the Nation," is used frequently. In addition to granting Rahmon lifelong immunity from prosecution, the law also gave him a number of other lifelong privileges, including veto powers over all major state decisions, the freedom to address the nation and parliament on all matters he deems important, and the privilege of attending all government meetings and parliament sessions.

Religion and convictions 

Rahmon is a Sunni Muslim and has frequently stressed his Muslim background even though his administration is engaged in a relentless campaign against public displays of Islamic devotion. His suppression of Islamic expression includes banning beards, attendance at mosque for women and children under 18, hajj for people under 40, studying in Islamic schools outside Tajikistan, the production, import or export of Islamic books without permission (implemented in 2017), using loudspeakers to broadcast the adhan, veils, madrassas, Islamist political parties and Arabic-sounding names (implemented in 2016). Furthermore, mosques are heavily regulated, providing unofficial Islamic teaching can lead to up to 12 years of imprisonment, and an arduous process is required to obtain a permit to establish an Islamic organisation, publish an Islamic book, or go on pilgrimage to Mecca. In January 2016, Rahmon performed an Umrah with a number of his children and senior members of his government. That was Rahmon's fourth pilgrimage to Mecca.

His reply to critics of the election standards of the 2006 Tajikistani presidential elections was: 

During a 2010 Organisation of Islamic Cooperation session in Dushanbe, Rahmon spoke against what he called the misuse of Islam for political ends, claiming that "Terrorism, terrorists, have no nation, no country, no religion... Using the name 'Islamic terrorism' only discredits Islam and dishonors the pure and harmless religion of Islam."

Membership in Hizb ut-Tahrir, a militant Islamic party that aims to overthrow secular governments and unify Tajiks under one Islamic state, is illegal and members are subject to arrest and imprisonment.

The Islamic Renaissance Party of Tajikistan (IRP) is a banned Islamist political party and has been designated a terrorist organization since 2015.

In 2017 the government of Tajikistan passed a law requiring people to "stick to traditional national clothes and culture", which has been widely seen as an attempt to prevent women from wearing Islamic clothing, in particular the style of headscarf wrapped under the chin, in contrast to the traditional Tajik headscarf tied behind the head.

Personal life

Family

He is married to Azizmo Asadullayeva and has seven daughters and two sons. Two of his children, Rustam Emomali and Ozoda Rahmon, are senior officials in his administration, while another, Zarina Rahmon, was appointed deputy head of Orienbank in January 2017. Rustam is believed to be prepared by his father to succeed him as leader of Tajikistan.

In the summer of 2021, coronavirus ravaged the country, and Emomali Rahmon's sister reportedly died in a hospital of COVID-19 on 20 July. According to local media, her sons physically assaulted the national health minister and a senior doctor.

Name changes

In March 2007, Rahmonov changed his surname to Rahmon, getting rid of the Russian-style "-ov" ending. He also removed the patronymic, Sharipovich, from his name altogether. Rahmon explained that he had done so out of respect for his cultural heritage. Following the move, scores of governments officials, members of parliament, and civil servants around the country removed Russian-style patronymics and "-ov" endings from their surnames. In April 2016, Tajikistan officially banned giving Russian-style patronymics and surnames to newborn children.

Honours and awards

 Honorary Doctorate of Leadership by the Limkokwing University of Creative Technology (LUCT)
  Hero of Tajikistan
  Order of Mubarak the Great
  Order of Prince Yaroslav the Wise (2008)
  Order of the Three Stars (2009)
  Order of Merit of Ukraine (2011)
  Heydar Aliyev Order (2012)
  Order of the President of Turkmenistan (2012)
  Order of the Republic of Serbia (2013)
  Order of Alexander Nevsky (2017)
  Order of Parasat (2018)
 Mark of Honour of Heads of State in Central Asia (2021)
  Order "For Merit to the Fatherland" (2022)
 Honorary Doctorate in arts by Cairo University

Notes

References

External links

1952 births
Heads of state of Tajikistan
Living people
People from Khatlon Region
Critics of Islamism
People's Democratic Party of Tajikistan politicians
Presidents of Tajikistan
Tajik National University alumni
Recipients of the Heydar Aliyev Order
Tajikistani Sunni Muslims
Recipients of the Order of Prince Yaroslav the Wise, 1st class
21st-century Tajikistani politicians
20th-century Tajikistani politicians
Communist Party of the Soviet Union members
Recipients of the Order of Alexander Nevsky
Recipients of the Order of Parasat